The Organization of Communist Internationalists of Greece–Spartacus ( (ΟΚΔΕ-Σπάρτακος)) is a Trotskyist group in Greece. It is the Greek section of the  Fourth International, and takes the name Spartacus (Σπάρτακος) from its magazine, which has been in various the name of the Fourth Internationalist journal in Greece.

Elections
In the 2007 Greek legislative election it was a central component in the United Anti-Capitalist Left electoral coalition. From 2009 it is a member of Front of the Greek Anticapitalist Left (ANTARSYA) coalition.

In the Greek legislative election, 2012 it broke with the Executive Bureau of the Fourth International which decided to switch support from Antarsya to Syriza. According to the section's Central Committee: "Unfortunately we realize with anguish that the Fourth International is not capable of playing the role it should play in this historical period and we wonder where we are going…"  The Greek section has since helped to form the "Revolutionary Marxists" faction in the Fourth International.

References

External links
OKDE-Spartacus website (Greek)
statement around time of Merkel's visit

1985 establishments in Greece
Communist parties in Greece
Far-left politics in Greece
Fourth International (post-reunification)
Political parties established in 1985
Trotskyist organizations in Greece